Bhausahab Rajaram Wakchaure  is a member of the 15th Lok Sabha of India. He represents the Shirdi (Lok Sabha constituency) of Maharashtra and is a member of the Shiv Sena (SS) political party.

External links
 Official biographical sketch in Parliament of India website

Living people
Shiv Sena politicians
People from Maharashtra
India MPs 2009–2014
People from Ahmedabad district
Lok Sabha members from Maharashtra
United Progressive Alliance candidates in the 2014 Indian general election
Marathi politicians
Year of birth missing (living people)